Asperula serotina is a species of flowering plant in the family Rubiaceae. It was first described in 1982 and is endemic to Turkey.

References

serotina
Flora of Turkey
Taxa named by Theodor von Heldreich
Taxa named by Pierre Edmond Boissier